The men's 5000 metres event at the 1948 Olympic Games took place July 31 and August 2.  The final was won by Gaston Reiff of Belgium.

Records
Prior to the competition, the existing World and Olympic records were as follows.

The following new Olympic record was set during this competition:

Schedule
All times are British Summer Time (UTC+1).

Results
The first four runners from each heat qualified to the final.

Heats
Heat 1

Heat 2

Heat 3

Final

Key: DNF = Did not finish, OR = Olympic record

References

External links
Organising Committee for the XIV Olympiad, The (1948). The Official Report of the Organising Committee for the XIV Olympiad. LA84 Foundation. Retrieved 5 September 2016.

Athletics at the 1948 Summer Olympics
5000 metres at the Olympics
Men's events at the 1948 Summer Olympics